KSDZ (95.5 FM) is a radio station licensed to Gordon, Nebraska, United States. The station airs a country music format and is currently owned by DJ Broadcasting, Inc. KSDZ is also heard in Valentine, Nebraska through a translator on 99.5.

References

External links
KSDZ's website

SDZ
Country radio stations in the United States